Chris Cvetkovic (born June 28, 1977) is a former Canadian football long snapper. He was originally signed by the Saskatchewan Roughriders as an undrafted free agent in 2002. Claimed off the Riders' practice roster by the Winnipeg Blue Bombers during the 2003 playoffs, he played 10 seasons in Winnipeg until retiring.  He played CIS Football for Concordia.

Cvetkovic announced his retirement on February 10, 2014.

References

External links
Winnipeg Blue Bombers bio

1977 births
Canadian football fullbacks
Canadian football long snappers
Canadian people of Serbian descent
Concordia Stingers football players
Living people
Players of Canadian football from Ontario
Saskatchewan Roughriders players
Sportspeople from Hamilton, Ontario
Winnipeg Blue Bombers players